George Rex may refer to:

George Rex (1765–1839), British-born entrepreneur and founder of Knysna
George Rex (politician) (1817–1879), Democratic politician in Wooster, Ohio

See also
George Rex Graham (1813–1894), Philadelphia journalist and publishing entrepreneur
King George (disambiguation)